Lo Hoi-pang (born 21 December 1941) is a Hong Kong actor and singer. Lo attended TVB's Training Classes in 1973. Among his classmates are Chow Yun-fat and Ng Man-tat. Lo won the 2012 31st Hong Kong Film Awards for the Best Supporting Actor category for his performance in Life Without Principle.

Filmography

The Legend of the Book and the Sword (1976)
The Iron-Fisted Monk (1977)
Ups and Downs in the Sea of Love (2003)
Life Without Principle (2012)
Drug War (2012)
Blind Detective (2013)
Tales from the Dark 1 (2013)
Rigor Mortis (2013)
The White Storm (2013)
Firestorm (2013)
Golden Chicken 3 (2014)
Iceman (2014)
Don't Go Breaking My Heart 2 (2014)
Delete My Love (2014)
Z Storm (2014)
12 Golden Ducks (2015)
King of Mahjong (2015)
Second Life (2015) (TV series)
SFC 3 (2015) (TV series) episode 5
Paranormal Mind (2015) (TV series)
Big Fortune Hotel (2015)
From Vegas to Macau III (2016)
 Let's Eat! (2016)
Buddy Cops (2016)
Three (2016)
Line Walker (2016)
S Storm (2016)
Meow (2017)
G Storm (2021)

References

External links
 

1941 births
Living people
Hong Kong male film actors
Hong Kong male television actors
Male actors from Guangdong
Male actors from Guangzhou
20th-century Hong Kong male actors
21st-century Hong Kong male actors
Chinese male film actors
Chinese male television actors
20th-century Chinese male actors
21st-century Chinese male actors